The Belgian Third Division A was one of the two leagues at the third level of the Belgian football league system, the other one being the Belgian Third Division B.  This division existed from the 1952–53 to 2015–16 seasons and was played every year with 18 clubs from 2009.  Prior to this, the third level in the Belgian football league system was called Promotion and was divided into four leagues of 16 clubs each and prior to the 1931–32 season, the Promotion was divided into three leagues. Due to restructuring, the Third Division was replaced by Belgian Second Amateur Division which plays as three leagues of 16 clubs each from the 2016–17 season.

The final clubs

 — R. ES Acrenoise won the Belgian Promotion play-off; admitted to replace defunct R.A.E.C. Mons
 — SK Sint-Niklaas promoted via the Belgian Promotion play-off

Past winners
1953: Tubantia F.C.
1954: K.F.C. Izegem
1955: K.F.C. Herentals
1956: R.C.S. Brugeois
1957: F.C. Diest
1958: R.F.C. Renaisien
1959: R.R.C. de Bruxelles
1960: K.F.C. Turnhout
1961: A.S. Oostende
1962: K.R.C. Mechelen
1963: K.S.V. Waregem
1964: K. Waterschei S.V. Thor Genk
1965: K. Willebroekse S.V.
1966: K.R.C. Mechelen
1967: R.R.C. Tournaisien
1968: K.F.C. Turnhout
1969: K.R.C. Mechelen
1970: R.A.A. Louviéroise
1971: K.S.K. Tongeren
1972: K.S.C. Lokeren
1973: Olse Merksem S.C.
1974: K. Waterschei S.V. Thor Genk
1975: K.A.A. Gent
1976: Royale Union
1977: K.S.C. Eendracht Aalst
1978: K.F.C. Turnhout
1979: Racing Jet de Bruxelles
1980: K.S.V. Oudenaarde
1981: K. Stade Leuven
1982: K. Sint-Niklase S.K.
1983: Racing Jet de Bruxelles
1984: Royale Union Saint-Gilloise
1985: R.A.E.C. Mons
1986: K.R.C. Harelbeke
1987: K.F.C. Eeklo
1988: K. Stade Leuven
1989: K. Sint-Niklase S.K.
1990: K.R.C. Harelbeke
1991: R.E. Mouscron
1992: K.V. Oostende
1993: K.M.S.K. Deinze
1994: R.A.A. Louviéroise
1995: R. Cappellen F.C.
1996: R.O.C. de Charleroi
1997: K.F.C. Vigor Wuitens Hamme
1998: K.S.K. Roeselare
1999: K.S.V. Ingelmunster
2000: K.F.C. Strombeek
2001: K.S.K. Ronse
2002: S.V. Zulte Waregem
2003: K. Berchem Sport
2004: K.V. Red Star Waasland
2005: Y.R. K.V. Mechelen
2006: F.C. Verbroedering Dender E.H.
2007: R.F.C. Tournai
2008: K.S.K. Ronse
2009: K. Standaard Wetteren
2010: K.S.K. Heist
2011: Eendracht Aalst
2012: Royal Mouscron-Péruwelz
2013: Hoogstraten VV
2014: K.R.C. Mechelen
2015: K.V.V. Coxyde

See also
Belgian Second Division
Belgian Third Division B
Belgian Promotion
Belgian football league system

References
 RSSSF Archive - Third division final tables (1952–2000)
 Sport.be website - Results, standings, stats and fixtures

A

fr:Championnat de Belgique de football D3